Phaeochlaena is a genus of moths of the family Notodontidae. It consists of the following species:
Phaeochlaena amazonica Druce, 1899
Phaeochlaena bicolor  (Möschler, 1877) 
Phaeochlaena costaricensis  Miller, 2008
Phaeochlaena gyon  (Fabricius, 1787) 
Phaeochlaena hazara  (Butler, 1871) 
Phaeochlaena lampra  Prout, 1918
Phaeochlaena solilucis  Butler, 1878

Notodontidae of South America